Sergio Carpanesi (born March 21, 1936 in La Spezia) is an Italian Association football coach and former player who played as a midfielder.

He played for 13 seasons (276 games, 8 goals) in Serie A for ACF Fiorentina, U.S. Città di Palermo, SPAL 1907, A.S. Roma and U.C. Sampdoria.

Honours
 Serie A champion: 1955/56.
 Coppa Italia winner: 1963/64.
 Inter-Cities Fairs Cup winner: 1960/61.

References

1936 births
Living people
Italian footballers
Serie A players
ACF Fiorentina players
Palermo F.C. players
S.P.A.L. players
A.S. Roma players
U.C. Sampdoria players
A.C. Ancona players
Italian football managers
Calcio Lecco 1912 managers
Pisa S.C. managers
A.C. Monza managers
Spezia Calcio managers
Mantova 1911 managers

Association football midfielders